Jaquan Bray (born April 28, 1993) is an American gridiron football wide receiver for the Ottawa Redblacks of the Canadian Football League (CFL). He played college football at Auburn, and signed with the Indianapolis Colts as an undrafted free agent in 2015.

High school career
Quan Bray was ranked as the nation's number 5 athlete by ESPN.com and the 40th overall recruit. He was projected by scouts as a running back, wide receiver, cornerback and safety, and committed to Auburn over Alabama on February 2, 2011. Following his senior year, Bray was selected to the 2011 Under Armour All-America Game.

College career
At Auburn, Bray was a second team coaches all-SEC team as a return specialist in his senior year and was the first player in school history to score a rushing, receiving, and punt return touchdown in the same season.

Professional career
Bray did not receive an invite to the 2015 NFL Combine.

Indianapolis Colts
After going undrafted in the 2015 NFL Draft, Bray was signed by the Indianapolis Colts on May 5, 2015. During training camp, Bray caught the eye of several Colts coaches.

Bray was waived by the Colts on September 5, 2015 and was signed to the practice squad on September 6, 2015. On October 27, Bray was elevated to the active roster after wide receiver Phillip Dorsett suffered a fractured fibula.

On October 18, 2016, Bray was placed on injured reserve.

On November 7, 2017, Bray was placed on injured reserve. He was released with an injury settlement on December 26, 2017.

Buffalo Bills

On December 30, 2017, Bray was signed to the Buffalo Bills' practice squad. He signed a reserve/future contract with the Bills on January 8, 2018. He was released on August 5, 2018.

Houston Texans
On August 12, 2018, Bray signed with the Houston Texans. He was waived on September 1, 2018.

Birmingham Iron
In 2019, Bray joined the Birmingham Iron of the Alliance of American Football. He was placed on injured reserve after the third game of the season on February 25, 2019. He was waived from injured reserve on March 26. He was added to the team's rights list and re-signed to a contract on April 1.

Montreal Alouettes
After the AAF ceased operations in April 2019, Bray signed with the Montreal Alouettes of the Canadian Football League (CFL) on May 19, 2019. In his first season, Bray caught 58 passes for 818 yards with six touchdowns. He also returned 16 kicks on special teams for 168 yards. He was released on February 16, 2021, and re-signed with the team on a one-year contract on March 15, 2021. He was placed on the suspended list on July 6, 2021 as the team wanted to retain his rights as he was delayed attempting to cross the border into Canada. One week later he was transferred to the active roster once he completed his mandatory seven-day quarantine period for training camp. Bray played in 12 games for the Alouettes during the 2021 season, catching 35 passes for 481 yards with two touchdowns. He also returned 12 punts. Bray was released by the Alouettes as part of the team's final roster cuts before the start of the 2022 regular season.

Ottawa Redblacks
On October 5, 2022, it was announced that Bray had signed a practice roster agreement with the Ottawa Redblacks.

NFL career statistics

CFL career statistics

Personal life
On July 3, 2011, Bray's mother Tonya was murdered by his father, Jeffrey Jones. Jones pled guilty and was sentenced to life in prison without the possibility of parole.

Bray was arrested in September 2012 on the campus of West Georgia during a traffic stop. He was charged for playing his music too loud and possession of alcohol by a minor.

On February 18, 2020, Bray and former Auburn teammate Greg Robinson were stopped by Border Patrol officers south of El Paso, Texas. Border Control agents found 157 pounds of marijuana in vacuum-sealed bags, $3,100 in cash, and an electronic scale. Both men were charged with felony possession with intent to distribute, and face up to 20 years in prison.

References

External links
Ottawa Redblacks bio
Indianapolis Colts bio
Auburn Tigers bio

1993 births
Living people
African-American players of American football
American football wide receivers
Auburn Tigers football players
Birmingham Iron players
Buffalo Bills players
Houston Texans players
Indianapolis Colts players
Montreal Alouettes players
Ottawa Redblacks players
People from LaGrange, Georgia
Players of American football from Georgia (U.S. state)
21st-century African-American sportspeople